Swiss School in Singapore (SSiS) is a Swiss international school in Bukit Timah, Singapore.

History 
The Swiss School in Singapore was founded in 1967 and officially opened on May 2, 1967. Marie-Therese and Werner Kaufmann-Sialm were the first two teachers sent from Switzerland to educate 18 children in Kindergarten and ten students in primary classes. On July 18, 1967, the ”Swiss School Association” was registered as a company without share capital.

Alumni 
The Swiss School Alumni Association was established on April 7, 2015, and is domiciled in Zug, Switzerland. The association's aim is to foster contact among former students, parents, employees and friends of SSiS beyond their time at SSiS.

References

External links

 Swiss School in Singapore
 Swiss School in Singapore 

International schools in Singapore
Swiss international schools
1967 establishments in Singapore
Educational institutions established in 1967